Again and Again is an album recorded by Chick Corea in 1982 in the middle of a South African tour and released in 1983.

Track listing 
All tracks by Chick Corea

"Quintet #3" – 9:24
"Waltze" – 7:56
"Again and Again" – 4:19
"1-2-1234" – 4:06
"Diddle Diddle" – 8:15
"Twang" – 11:01

Personnel 

Musicians
 Chick Corea – Fender Rhodes, Minimoog, Hohner Duo, Oberheim OB-Xa, Yamaha GS-1, Prime Time Digital Delay electronics, cowbell (6),  Chinese cymbal (6)
 Steve Kujala – flutes, soprano saxophone, tenor saxophone
 Carles Benavent – electric bass
 Tom Brechtlein – drums 
 Don Alias – percussion

Production
 Chick Corea – producer, liner notes 
 Kristen Kasell Nikosey – design 
 Norm Ung – design 
 Milton Avery – front cover painting 
 Norman Seeff – back cover photography

Chart performance

References 

1983 albums
Chick Corea albums
Elektra/Musician albums